Propylamphetamine is a psychoactive drug and research chemical of the phenethylamine and amphetamine chemical classes which acts as a stimulant. It was first developed in the 1970s, mainly for research into the metabolism of, and as a comparison tool to, other amphetamines. A study in rats found propylamphetamine to be 1/4 as potent as amphetamine.

See also 
 Amphetamine
 Ethylamphetamine
 Isopropylamphetamine
 Methamphetamine
 Phenylpropylaminopentane

References 

Substituted amphetamines
Norepinephrine-dopamine releasing agents